Coral Ridge Baptist University (CRBU) was a Bible college and seminary in Florida. It merged with Freedom University and Seminary in 2001.

History
CRBU was founded by a group of Baptist ministers and non-denominational ministers, affiliated with  the Liberty Baptist Fellowship, Southern Baptist Convention, Coral Ridge Christian Fellowship, the Baptist Bible Fellowship,  and the World Baptist Fellowship.  Based in Jacksonville, Florida, the Coral Ridge church provided all needed classrooms, offices and equipment.  The school was seen as an extension of evangelistic ministry or as "the church involved in education and ministry training". Training in Women's Ministries began at the school's inception.

In 1992, Don Sills  opened a branch of the school near Cedar City, Utah. This branch was named George Wythe College. Graduate student Oliver DeMille and two others began teaching on-campus classes at this location on September 21, 1992.

On January 1, 2002, George Wythe College became independent of CRBU.

Degrees offered
In 2001 CRBU offered the following degrees, all "designed solely for ecclesiastical or ministerial and Christian education vocations".''
 A.A. in Biblical Studies
 B.A. in Biblical Studies
 M.A. in Religion and in Divinity
 Ministry
 Ph.D. in  Christian History, Biblical Missions, and   Youth Ministries
 Th.D. in  Theology

Other
CRBU merged with Freedom University. CRBU is not connected with D. James Kennedy's Coral Ridge Ministries.

Notable alumni

References 

Educational institutions established in 1985
Defunct private universities and colleges in Florida
1985 establishments in Florida